The Independent Basketball Association (IBA) was a semi-professional men's basketball league that began play in the fall of 2011. The six charter members were Battle Creek Knights, Chicago Redline, Gary Splash, Kankakee County Soldiers, Lake County Stars and Rockford Riverdawgs.

The IBA played two separate seasons each calendar year: a Spring season (March–June) and a Fall season (September–January). Teams competed in one or both league competitions.

The last commissioner of the IBA was Barry Bradford, president of the Kankakee County Soldiers.

History 
The first league championship (2011–12) was won by the Kankakee County Soldiers, who also won the 2012 Spring season championship.

In the Spring of 2012 the league expanded beyond its midwest footprint, adding a total of seven teams: Albany Legends, Kenosha Ballers, Lansing Capitals, Los Angeles Lightning, Malibu Pirates, Springfield Xpress and St. Louis Trotters.

The Holland Dream were added to the IBA for its third season in 2012–13, bringing the league total to 14 teams.

IBA and PBL joined forces in 2013, but the merger was short-lived. Travel issues, questions of league rules and other issues were too much to overcome and the two parted ways before the end of the Spring season.

2013-14 began with the addition of the Windy City Blazers, who played previously as the Windy City Monsters in the ABA. Grand Rapids Fusion and Markham City Racers entered league play for the 2014 Spring season.

In the Fall season of 2014-15 four teams (Binghamton Pioneers, Jersey G-Force, Kansas City Kryptonite, and Toronto 3D) played a partial schedule in anticipation of full league membership in 2015. CyFair Cobras, Houston Xperience and Louisiana Soul also were to compete as "branding teams" in the Fall season. None played an IBA game.

In December 2014 Schenectady Legends captured their first IBA championship, defeating Kenosha 154–137. Albany High School graduate Lloyd "Pooh" Johnson score an IBA championship game record 61 points and was named the game MVP.

Kankakee County won their league-best sixth championship in the Fall of 2015 by avenging their finals loss to St. Louis for the Spring title.

Teams

Former teams

^ = affiliate members (did not compete for championship)

Champions

Awards

References

External links 
 Official IBA website

 
Basketball leagues in the United States
Professional sports leagues in the United States
Sports leagues established in 2011
2011 establishments in the United States